Alan G. Parker is an Emmy-nominated British documentary film director best known for his films Who Killed Nancy?, Monty Python: Almost The Truth - The Lawyers Cut and It Was Fifty Years Ago Today! The Beatles: Sgt. Pepper & Beyond.  He also wrote a number of books about rock musicians and their lives.

Early life and career 
Parker was born in Lancashire, England.  As child he was diagnosed with macrocephaly.

Prior to becoming a filmmaker, Parker worked as a press officer and spent a number of years in the catalogue department at EMI Records in London. At EMI, Parker worked with various punk and rock bands such as the Buzzcocks, Public Image Ltd and  Stiff Little Fingers.  During that time he also wrote for magazines and published books about Sid Vicious, The Clash and Stiff Little Fingers.

In 2009 he directed Who Killed Nancy? and made Monty Python: Almost The Truth - The Lawyers Cut, the latter being nominated for six Emmy awards.  Parker also directed the documentary It Was Fifty Years Ago Today! The Beatles: Sgt. Pepper & Beyond, released in 2017.

Films directed
Who Killed Nancy? (2009)
Love Kills (2007) (documentary included in a 2007 DVD-reissue of Sid and Nancy)
Monty Python: Almost the Truth (Lawyers Cut) (2009)
The David Essex Story
Hello Quo - The Official Status Quo Movie (2012)
Rebel Truce - The History of The Clash (2007)
Never Mind the Sex Pistols (2005)
The Making of All Mod Cons - The Jam (dir. Don Letts, contributor) (2006)
It Was Fifty Years Ago Today! The Beatles: Sgt. Pepper & Beyond (2017)

Books published
 The Who by Numbers: The Story of The Who Through Their Music, 2009 
 Sid Vicious: No One Is Innocent, 2007  
 Cum On, Feel the Noize: The Story of Slade, 2006 
 Vicious: Too Fast to Live, 2004  
 Stiff Little Fingers: Song by Song, 2003 
 The Clash: Rat Patrol from Fort Bragg, 2003 
 John Lennon & The FBI Files, 2003 
  Satellite: Sex Pistols, 1999  
 Sid’s Way: Sid Vicious, 1991 
 Hardcore Superstar: Traci Lords
Young Flesh Required: Sex Pistols 2011

References

External links

1965 births
Living people
Place of birth missing (living people)
People from Blackburn
English music journalists
English biographers